Kurt Arthur Benno Student (12 May 1890 – 1 July 1978) was a German general in the Luftwaffe during World War II. An early pioneer of airborne forces, Student was in overall command of developing a paratrooper force to be known as the Fallschirmjäger, and as the most senior member of the Fallschirmjäger, commanded it throughout the war. Student led the first major airborne attack in history, the Battle for The Hague, in May 1940. He also commanded the Fallschirmjäger in its last major airborne operation, the invasion of Crete in May 1941. The operation was a success despite German losses, and led the Allies to hasten the training and development of their own airborne units.

In 1947, Student was tried and convicted of war crimes for the mistreatment and murder of prisoners of war by his men in Crete. Student was also responsible for a wave of reprisal massacres committed against Cretan civilians in 1941 but avoided harsh punishment.

Early life and career
Student entered the Prussian Army as a Fähnrich in 1910 and was commissioned a lieutenant in March 1911. He qualified as a pilot in 1913 and served during World War I.

World War I
In July 1916, he became a charter member of the Fokker Scourge, when he scored his first confirmed victory, forcing Nieuport 11 no. 1324 to land behind German lines. He then served in aerial units of the Third Army on the Western Front, including Jagdstaffel 9 (Jasta 9), which he commanded from 5 October 1916 to 2 May 1917, when he was wounded. He scored six air-to-air victories over French aircraft between 1916 and 1917, with two coming after his wound. He left Jasta 9 on 14 March 1918.

Interwar period
In the immediate postwar years, Student was assigned to military research and development. He became involved in military gliders since gliding was not forbidden by the Treaty of Versailles. He also attended the Red Army Air Force's maneuvers and first came in contact with the idea of airborne operations. After Adolf Hitler came to power in Germany, the Luftwaffe was secretly re-established. Student transferred from the Army to the Air Force and was appointed by Hermann Göring to be the head of its training schools. In July 1938, he was named commander of airborne and air-landing troops and, in September, commanding general of the 7th Air Division, Germany's first paratroop division.

World War II
After the  invasion of Poland, which marked the beginning of the Second World War in Europe, the Fallschirmjäger were first deployed during the invasions of Norway and Denmark in Operation Weserübung. In this operation the Fallschirmjäger were deployed on several locations. In Denmark, a small unit dropped on Masnedø island to seize the Storstrøm Bridge linking Falster and Zealand. A paratroop detachment also dropped at Aalborg Airfield, which was crucial for Luftwaffe operations over Norway. In Norway, a company of paratroopers dropped at Oslo's undefended airstrip. Over the course of the morning and early afternoon of April 9, 1940, the Germans flew in sufficient reinforcements to seize the capital, but by that time the Norwegian government had fled.

The paratroopers' first major action and the first large scale airborne operation in history, was the battle for The Hague on 10 May 1940. German paratroopers landed at three airfields near The Hague. From one of these airfields, they were driven out after the first wave of reinforcements, brought in by Ju 52s, was annihilated by anti-aircraft fire and fierce resistance by some remaining Dutch defenders. The other two airfields were recaptured as well. Simultaneously, small packets of paratroopers seized the crucial bridges that led directly across the Netherlands and into the heart of the country. They opened the way for the 9th Panzer Division. Within a day, the Dutch position became undefendable. Nevertheless, Dutch forces inflicted high losses on German transportation aircraft. Moreover, 1200 German elite troops from the Luftlandekorps taken prisoner around The Hague, were shipped to England just before the capitulation of the Dutch armed forces.

During airborne operations in the Battle of Rotterdam, Student was almost taken prisoner, and was shot in the head – by what was later determined to be a stray German round. His capture was halted by the Rotterdam Blitz on 14 May and subsequent capitulation of the Netherlands. 

On 10 May 1940, the Fallschirmjäger performed a successful raid on the largest fort in the world at the time, Eben-Emael, manned by 1,200 Belgian troops. The raid was accomplished by an assault group which consisted of only 85 soldiers. It took the Fallschirmjäger only hours to take control of the fort. The fall of Eben-Emael opened up Belgium for invasion by Army Group B. For his role in the raid, Student was decorated with the Knight's Cross of the Iron Cross.

In January 1941, Student was named commanding general of the XI. Fliegerkorps, the newly formed command for the expanding German airborne forces. In May 1941, Student directed Operation Mercury (Unternehmen Merkur), the airborne invasion of Crete, defended by British, Greek and Commonwealth forces. Crete was taken, in what became the Fallschirmjäger'''s greatest victory, but the high casualties caused Hitler to forbid future major airborne operations. 

During the invasion of Crete, the German forces encountered unexpected mass resistance from the Cretan civilian population, and several German parachutists were killed by civilians armed only with knives and clubs. The German troops were initially surprised and later outraged. German military intelligence, the Abwehr, had predicted that the Cretan population would welcome the Germans as liberators, due to their strong republican and anti-monarchist feelings and would want to receive the "... favourable terms which had been arranged on the mainland ...". Student was made the temporary commander of Crete, immediately after the island's surrender on 31 May 1941. On Hermann Göring's orders, Student launched a wave of brutal reprisals against the local population with the Massacre of Kondomari, Alikianos, and the Razing of Kandanos being well-known examples.

In 1943, Student ordered Major Harald Mors to plan Operation Oak (Unternehmen Eiche), the successful raid conducted by a special Fallschirmjäger unit to free Italian dictator Benito Mussolini. They landed with gliders and STOL aircraft on a hilltop. Student received the Oak Leaves to the Knight's Cross of the Iron Cross for his role in the operation.

Student was transferred to Italy and later to France, where he was involved in the battles of Normandy in 1944. He was put in charge of the First Paratroop Army and took part in countering the Allied Operation Market Garden, near Arnhem. After a brief time at the Eastern Front in Mecklenburg in 1945, he was captured by British forces in Schleswig-Holstein in April of that same year, before he could take command of Army Group Vistula.

War crimes conviction

In May 1947, Student was put on trial on eight charges of mistreatment and murder of prisoners of war by his men in Crete, and crimes against the civilian population of Crete, like those at Kondomari, Alikianos and Kandanos). He was found guilty of three charges relating to prisoners of war, but acquitted of crimes against civilians owing to the testimony of Brigadier Lindsay Inglis, commander of the 4th New Zealand Brigade. Student was sentenced to five years of imprisonment but was given an early discharge in 1948 for medical reasons. He died in 1978, the last surviving Luftwaffe Generaloberst.

Promotions
Fahnrich (3 March 1910)
Leutnant (20 March 1911)
Oberleutnant (18 June 1915)
Hauptmann (20 June 1918)
Major (1 January 1930)
Oberstleutnant (1 January 1934)
Oberst (1 October 1935)
Generalmajor (1 April 1938)
Generalleutnant (1 January 1940)
General der Flieger (29 May 1940)
Generaloberst (13 July 1944)

Awards
 Iron Cross (1914)
 2nd Class (26 September 1914)
 1st Class (29 August 1915)
 Clasp to the Iron Cross (1939)
 2nd Class (20 September 1939)
 1st Class (20 September 1939)
 Knight's Cross of the Iron Cross with Oak Leaves
 Knight's Cross on 12 May 1940 as Generalleutnant and commander of the 7. Flieger-Division (Fallschirmjäger).
 305th Oak Leaves on 27 September 1943 as General der Flieger and commander of XI. Flieger-Korps (Luft-lande-Korps)
 Pilot/Observer Badge in Gold with Diamonds (2 September 1941)

References

Citations

Bibliography

 

 
 
 Farrar-Hockley, General Sir Anthony. Student, Ballantine's Illustrated History of World War II / the Violent Century: War Leader #15.  Ballantine's, 1973.  .
 Franks, Norman; Bailey, Frank W.; Guest, Russell. Above the Lines: The Aces and Fighter Units of the German Air Service, Naval Air Service and Flanders Marine Corps, 1914–1918''. Grub Street, 1993. , .
 
 

 
 
 

|-

|-

|-

|-

|-

1890 births
1978 deaths
Luftwaffe World War II generals
Luftstreitkräfte personnel
Fallschirmjäger of World War II
German World War I flying aces
People from the Province of Brandenburg
Recipients of the Knight's Cross of the Iron Cross with Oak Leaves
Battle of Crete
Crete in World War II
Prussian Army personnel
Recipients of the clasp to the Iron Cross, 1st class
Colonel generals of the Luftwaffe
Luftwaffe personnel convicted of war crimes
People from Świebodzin County
German glider pilots